The Hassane is a name for the traditionally dominant warrior tribes of the Sahrawi-Moorish areas of present-day Mauritania, southern Morocco and Western Sahara. Although lines were blurred by intermarriage and tribal re-affiliation, the Hassane were considered descendants of the Arab Maqil tribe Beni Hassan (hence the name). They held power over Sanhadja Berber-descended zawiya (religious) and znaga (servant) tribes, extracting from these the horma tax in exchange for armed protection.

Occasionally, such as in the case of the important Reguibat tribe, Zawāyā Berber groups would rise to Hassane status by growing in power and prestige and taking up armed raiding; they would then often Arabize culturally to fit the prevailing image of Hassane tribes as original Arabs.

A good example of a Hassane tribe is the Río de Oro-centered Oulad Delim, which is considered as among the purest descendants of the Beni Hassan.

See also 

Tribal castes and terms
 Zawāyā (religious tribes)
 Znaga (subservient tribes)
 Haratine (former slaves, freedmen)
 Abid (slaves)
 Igaouen (griot bards and magicians)

Other
 Mauritania
 Western Sahara
 Hassaniya Arabic
 Arab
 Berber
 Sahrawi
 Moors

References

Further reading 

 John Mercer (1976), Spanish Sahara, George Allen & Unwid Ltd
 Anthony G. Pazzanita (2006), Historical Dictionary of Western Sahara, Scarecrow Press
 Virginia Thompson and Richard Adloff (1980), The Western Saharans. Background to Conflict, Barnes & Noble Books

Sahrawi tribes
Ethnic groups in Western Sahara
Society of Mauritania
Berber peoples and tribes
Berbers in Mauritania
Berbers in Western Sahara
Arab groups